The Chamber of Senators of Uruguay (Cámara de Senadores de Uruguay), or Senate, is the upper house of the General Assembly of Uruguay (Asamblea General del Uruguay). It has 30 members, elected for a five-year term by proportional representation; the Vice-president presides over the chamber's sessions.

The composition and powers of the Senate are established by Article Ninety-eight of the Uruguayan Constitution. It also requires that the senators must be at least 30 years old and have been Uruguayan citizens for seven years. In addition to the functions that it performs jointly with the House of Representatives through the General Assembly, it stands out as a competence that falls solely on the House of Senators to open a public trial to those accused by the House of Representatives or the Junta Departamental, in their case, and pronounce sentence for the sole purpose of separating them from their positions, by two-thirds of the total number of its components.

Latest elections
As of the 2019 general election, 13 Senators represent the Frente Amplio, 10 represent the National Party, 4 represent the Colorado Party, and 3 represent the Open Cabildo Party.

Senators

See also
List of presidents of the Senate of Uruguay

References

External links
Politics Data Bank at the Social Sciences School - Universidad de la República (Uruguay)

Uruguay
Government of Uruguay
General Assembly of Uruguay
Government agencies with year of establishment missing
1830 establishments in Uruguay